Pascal Paul Vincent Comelade (born 30 June 1955), is a French musician.

Comelade was born in Montpellier, France. After living for several years in Barcelona, he made his first album, Fluence, influenced by electronic music and by the group Heldon.

Subsequently, his music has become more acoustic and is characterised by the sounds of toy instruments, used as solo-instruments and as an integral part of the sound of his group, the Bel Canto Orquestra. In 2007 he did a Take-Away Show acoustic video session shot by Vincent Moon.

He has collaborated with many singers and musicians from diverse genres of music including Robert Wyatt, Dani, Faust, Christophe Miossec, Toti Soler, Jac Berrocal, Pierre Bastien and P.J. Harvey to mention just a few.

Discography

 1975 : Fluence
 1978 :
 Séquences Paiennes
 Vertical Pianos
 1980 :
 Paralelo
 Ready-Made
 1981  : Slow Music
 1982 :
 Sentimientos
 Irregular Organs
 1983 :
 Fall Of Saigon
 Logique du Sens
 1984 :
 La Dialectique Peut-Elle Casser des Briques ? (with Cathy Claret's voice).
 Bel Canto Orquestra
 Milano Enharmonisto
 Précis de Décomposition Bruitiste
 Scénes de Musique Ralentie
 Détail Monochrome
 1986 : Bel Canto
 1987 : El Primitivismo
 1988 :
 Impressionnismes
 Rock Del Veneno
 1989 :
 33 Bars
 Cent Regards
 1991 :
 Ragazzin' The Blues
 Pataphysical Polka
 Haikus de Pianos
 1992 :
 Traffic d'Abstraction
 Topographie Anecdotique
 El Ermitaño - with Bel Canto Orquestra
 1993 : Yo Quiero Un Tebeo
 1994 : Danses Et Chants de Syldavie (Apologie de la reprise individuelle)
 1995 : El Cabaret Galactic
 1996 :
 Musiques Pour Films Vol.2
 Tango Del Rossello
 Un samedi Sur la Terre - Soundtrack
 1997 :
 Un Tal Jazz
 Oblique Sessions - with Pierre Bastien, Jac Berrocal and Jaki Liebezeit
 1998 :
 L'Argot du Bruit (with PJ Harvey)
 ZumZum.Ka
 Bel Canto Orquestra In Concerto
 1999 :
 Musiques De Genre
 Live In Lisbon and Barcelona
 Oblique Sessions II - with Richard Pinhas
 Swing Slang Song
 2000 :
 Aigua de Florida Classes de Música a la Granja - with Llorenç Balsach
 André Le Magnifique - Soundtrack (followed by 3 pieces written for the ballet "Spring man" by Ryohei Kondo and 6 pieces written for the ballet "Zumzum-ka" by Cesc Gelabert.)
 September Song - with Robert Wyatt
 Pop Songs Del Rossello - with Gérard Jacquet
 Pastis Catalan - Music for the Musée d'Art moderne de Céret (Limited Edition of 50 copies signed and numbered.)
 2001 :
 La Isla Del Holandés - with José Manuel Pagan
 Pop Songs Del Rossello 2 - with Gérard Jacquet
 2002 :
 Sense el Resso del Dring
 Psicotic Music' Hall
 2003 :
 Logicofobisme del Piano en Minuscul
 Musica Pop (Danses de Catalunya Nord)
 2004 :
 La Filosofia del Plat Combinat
 Back to Schizo 1975-1983
 2005 : Espace Détente - Soundtrack
 2006
 Espontex sinfonia
 La Manera Més Salvatge - with Enric Casasses
 Stranger In Paradigm
2007 : Mètode de Rocanrol
 2008
 Compassió pel dimoni
 The No-Dancing
 2009
 A Freak Serenade (Because) / Friki Serenata (Discmedi)
 2010
 Montpellier - with Gérard Pansanel and Pep Pascual
 N'ix - with Enric Casasses
 2011
 Pascal Comelade & Cobla Sant Jordi - with the Cobla Sant Jordi
 Somiatruites - with Albert Pla
 2013
 Flip Side (Of Sophism) - with Richard Pinhas
 El pianista del antifaz
 Mosques de colors - with Pau Riba
 Despintura fonica
 Avis aux inventeurs d'épaves - Book of 166 Comelade paintings with two 7" singles

External links
 Illustrated and commented discography, from 2000 onwards (in English)
 Video interview by Vilaweb 22/06/06, Catalan

1955 births
French film score composers
French male film score composers
Musicians from Montpellier
Living people
Because Music artists